Sudwala Pass is situated in the Mpumalanga province, on the R539 road between Sudwala and Lydenburg (South Africa).

Mountain passes of Mpumalanga